Bhuwan Dhungana (born 2 August 1947) is a Nepali writer and poet. She is best known for her short story The Thousand Rupee Note which has also been translated into English and Urdu. Her first novel Parityakta was published in 2020.

Early life and education 
She was born as Bhuwan Koirala on 2 August 1947 (18 Shrawan 2004 BS) in Biratnagar city of eastern Nepal in a political family. Although born to a political family, she was never attracted towards the world of politics.

She received her primary education from Varanasi, India and secondary education from Biratnagar. She received a Diploma in Law from Ratna Rajya Lakshmi Campus, Kathmandu. Through Colombo plan, she received scholarship to attend Visva-Bharati University in Santiniketan, West Bengal. In the university, she studied Manipuri dance for three years. She received a Diploma in Manipuri dance and Bengali literature in 1971. She completed her post graduate education from Tribhuvan University in 1973.

Literary career 
Her first writing was a poem called Shabdakosh Ko Aa Jastai published in Madhuparka magazine in 2026 BS. Her stories were published in various literary magazines such as Madhuparka, Garima and other national daily newspaper. She has written in various national daily advocating for freedom of speech and democracy. She was one of the key person in establishing an organization called Gunjan for women writers to meet monthly and discuss literature.

She was one of the 20 members who signed to establish the PEN Center in Kathmandu.

She worked as an editor for Siudi, a literary magazine form 1969 (2026 BS) to 1991 (2048 BS).

Dhungana once recited a poem in September 2002 in an vent organized by poet Kedar Man Vyathit and attended by politician Ganesh Man Singh. Being touched by Dhungana's poem, Singh became very emotional.

She was awarded with BP Koirala literature award instituted by BP Koirala Memorial Trust in 2016.

In 2020, she published her first novel Parityakta, which was shortlisted for the prestigious Madan Puraskar.

Works

Short story collection 
 Yuddhako Ghoshana Garnu Bhanda Aghi
 Dharmabimba

Short stories 
 The Thousand Rupee Note
 Bhok (Hunger)

Novel 
 Parityakta (2020)

Awards and honours 
She was awarded Dr. Bimala Mohan Sahitya Puraskar by Indra Mohan Smriti Guthi in 2020 (2077 BS) for her contribution to Nepali poetry and literature since last five decades.

In 2020 (2077 BS), her debut novel Parityakta was shortlisted for Madan Puraskar.

See also 
 Neelam Karki Niharika
 Banira Giri
 Parijat

References

External links 
 Bhok story

Living people
Nepalese writers
21st-century Nepalese writers
21st-century Nepalese women writers
Nepalese poets
Nepalese women poets
Nepalese short story writers
People from Biratnagar
1947 births
Khas people
Ratna Rajya Laxmi Campus alumni